Xylorhiza tortifolia is a species of flowering plant in the family Asteraceae, known by the common names Mojave-aster and Mojave woodyaster.

Distribution
The flowering plant is native to the Mojave Desert, Sonoran Desert, and Great Basin Desert ecoregions of the southwestern United States, California, and northwestern Mexico.

Habitats it is found in include creosote bush scrub, saltbush scrub, and Joshua tree woodlands.

Description
Xylorhiza tortifolia is a perennial herb or subshrub with branching, hairy, glandular stems that reach  in height/length. The leaves are linear, lance-shaped, or oval, with pointed or spiny tips and spiny edges. The leaf surfaces are hairy and glandular.

The inflorescence is a solitary flower head borne on a long peduncle. The head has a base with long, narrow phyllaries which may be over 2 centimeters long. The head contains up to 60 or more lavender, pale blue, or white ray florets which may be over 3 centimeters long. The bloom period is March through June.

The fruit is an achene which may be over a centimeter long, including its pappus of bristles.

Varieties
Xylorhiza tortifolia var. imberbis — Imberis woodyaster, Great Basin region in Nevada, Utah, Arizona.<ref>[http://plants.usda.gov/core/profile?symbol=XYTOI USDA: Xylorhiza tortifolia var. imberbis]</ref>
Xylorhiza tortifolia  var. parashantensis	— Parashant woodyaster, endemic to Arizona.

Taxonomy
Desert species of this aster with a woody base (Xylorhiza means woody base) are classified under the genus Xylorhiza, and have been removed from the large and complex genus Machaeranthera, where they were placed for many decades.  A similar species, Xylorhiza wrightii−Big Bend aster, is native to the Chihuahuan Desert in western Texas and northern Mexico.

Uses
The Havasupai used the plant for incense and fragrance, with ground leaves carried in the clothes and used as perfume by men and women to counteract body odors.

References

Bibliography

External links
 Calflora Database: Xylorhiza tortifolia (Mojave woodyaster)
USDA Plants Profile for Xylorhiza tortifolia (Mojave woodyaster)
Jepson Manual eFlora (TJM2) treatment of Xylorhiza tortifolia var. tortifolia
UC Photos gallery for Xylorhiza tortifolia

Astereae
Flora of Northwestern Mexico
Flora of the Southwestern United States
Flora of the California desert regions
Flora of the Great Basin
Flora of the Sonoran Deserts
Natural history of the Colorado Desert
Natural history of the Mojave Desert
Taxa named by Asa Gray
Taxa named by John Torrey
Flora without expected TNC conservation status